"The 100 Greatest Songwriters of All Time" is a feature published by the American magazine Rolling Stone in August 2015. The list presented was compiled based on the magazine's music critics, and unlike previous lists the votes came entirely from the magazine's staff. However, it predominantly features American and English songwriters solely of the rock era.

Top 10 songwriters

Reception
The list received mixed response from fellow publications. Writing for Flavorwire, Judy Berman criticized the selection of the songwriters, saying "Predictably, it's over 70% white and features only nine solo female songwriters (five other women are included as part of mixed-gender writing teams). Classic rock is overrepresented; every other genre and subgenre of popular music is underrepresented." Geeta Dayal from The Guardian accused "corporate sponsorship" in determining the list's content. Tom Moon from NPR wrote that "This list represents another trip through the hagiographic, hermetically sealed rock hall of fame, with the same stars you've been reading about in Rolling Stone since the dinosaur age." The Daily Telegraph editor Martin Chilton responded with a list of 100 best songwriters neglected by Rolling Stone, including Cole Porter, Townes Van Zandt, Ewan MacColl, Kate Bush, and Ray Charles.

Jacqueline Cutler from New York Daily News agreed with the magazine for ranking Bob Dylan as the top songwriter. Jon Bream from Star Tribune praised the inclusion of songwriters from Minnesota and said that Dylan as a number-one songwriter is not surprising at all. Lori Melton from AXS said that the list "reads like an iconic student body in a songwriting master class" and complimented the inclusion of female songwriters Carole King, Joni Mitchell, Dolly Parton, Stevie Nicks, Madonna, Chrissie Hynde, Loretta Lynn, Lucinda Williams, and Björk, as well as Taylor Swift who is the youngest person on the list.

See also
 List of best-selling music artists
 The 100 Greatest Artists of All Time, also from Rolling Stone magazine
 The 500 Greatest Albums of All Time, also from Rolling Stone magazine
 The 500 Greatest Songs of All Time, also from Rolling Stone magazine

References

Lists of artists
Rolling Stone articles
Songwriters